George Young Johnson (1820 Guilderland, Albany County, New York – June 30, 1872 Altamont, Albany County, New York) was an American politician from New York.

Life
He was the son of Dr. Jonathan Johnson, a physician, and Gertrude (Waldron) Johnson (1793–1864). He attended a district school, and at age 16 became a clerk in a dry-goods store. Four years later he opened his own store. About 1853, he bought a farm, and engaged in agricultural pursuits. While in business, he studied privately medicine and law, and was admitted to the bar in 1856, but did not practice.

He was Supervisor of the Town of Guilderland from 1855 to 1857, and in 1856 was Chairman of the Board of Supervisors of Albany County.

He was a member of the New York State Senate (13th D.) in 1858 and 1859, nominated on the Know Nothing ticket, and endorsed by the Republicans.

His cousin Gertrude Young (b. 1810) was married to Wisconsin State Senator George Gale (1816–1868).

Sources
 The New York Civil List compiled by Franklin Benjamin Hough, Stephen C. Hutchins and Edgar Albert Werner (1867; pg. 442)
 Biographical Sketches of the State Officers and Members of the Legislature of the State of New York in 1859 by William D. Murray (pg. 61ff)
 The Gale Family Records in England and the United States by George Gale (Galesville, Wisconsin, 1866; pg. 184f)
 George Young Johnson at Ancestry.com

1820 births
1872 deaths
New York (state) state senators
People from Guilderland, New York
New York (state) Know Nothings
19th-century American politicians
Town supervisors in New York (state)